Thomas Norman Foster was an Australian Pentecostal minister. He was one of the co-founders of the Christian Revival Crusade, and is also associated with British Israelism. He was invited by the London B.B.C. to do the Radio News Reel Broadcast to Australia of the Coronation procession of Queen Elizabeth II, in 1953. Former Commissioner of the British-Israel-World Federation, Victoria., and Y.M.C.A. Representative, A.I.F., Australia.

He authored books on British Israelism and the Baptism in the Holy Spirit.

Early life 
Foster was born child of nine in Mornington Victoria. Before starting his religious studies, Foster worked at the National Bank of Australia, Casterton. Foster then studied Christian ministry under the teachings of Rev E.E. Baldwin at the Presbyterian Training College, Carlton.

Publications 
Foster wrote several books on the topic of Baptism in the Holy Spirit, British Israelism and pyramidology.
 The Antichrist: Who is he? (1975)
 Miracles of Inner Healing (1975)
 Amazing Book of Revelation Explained! (1977)
 Great Pyramid Power (1979)
 When Russia Attacks America (1980)
 The Baptism in the Holy Spirit (1985)
 Britain's Royal Throne (1986)
 Soviet Power or God's Kingdom (1988)

See also 
 Christianity and Biblical prophecy
 Ten Lost Tribes

References

British Israelism
Australian non-fiction writers
1995 deaths
 
1909 births
People from Mornington, Victoria
Clergy from Melbourne